Greatest Heavyweights is a boxing video game that was published by Sega in 1993. It was released for the Sega Genesis console. It is a follow-up to Evander Holyfield's Real Deal Boxing, and is virtually identical in many ways, apart from a number of significant improvements.

Overview
The game features eight of the most famous and successful heavyweight boxers in history: Muhammad Ali, Jack Dempsey, Joe Frazier, Larry Holmes, Evander Holyfield, Joe Louis, Rocky Marciano, and Floyd Patterson. There are also a total of thirty other imaginary fighters present in the game. The cartridge supports the six-button control pad (an improvement over the controller options of its predecessor).

Gameplay

The gameplay of the game is very similar to that featured in Evander Holyfield's Real Deal Boxing. Perhaps the most noticeable improvement is the speed of the game; it is significantly faster than the aforementioned title. The "taunting" feature is also improved; the phrases used are now more varied, because each of the boxers based on real-life fighters have their own set of taunts. Some of them reflect utterances actually spoken by them during their careers. Boxers will now also sometimes taunt their opponents before fights as well as during them.

The game uses an identical 'attributes' system for each boxer to Evander Holyfield's Real Deal Boxing, apart from one change: the attribute "defense" is no longer present. As with Evander Holyfield in the previously-mentioned game, the eight real-life fighters have maximum values on all of the attributes featured.

Career mode is slightly altered, in that the player fights their way through the thirty imaginary boxers in the game, with the last of these fights being for the World Heavyweight Title. After the player has won the title, they then fight all eight of the pugilists based on real-life boxers, in 'challenge' matches. Also, when creating a fighter, it is no longer possible to alter whether the boxer is left or right-handed. Instead, it is now possible to choose the physical size of your boxer from three pre-sets. An improvement over Evander Holyfield's Real Deal Boxing is that the player now has many more colors to choose from when determining skin and hair colour for their fighter. If they so wish, they can have boxers that are wildly unrealistic colours such as bright blue or green. There are also more colors to choose from when adjusting the color of a fighter's shorts.

There is one new mode: tournament. In this mode, a player takes control of one of the eight real-life boxers in the game, and competes against the other seven in an eight-man tournament. In any of the three modes, the player can choose to have their fighter on either the left or right side of the screen.

The real-life boxers featured in the game reflect the fighters they are based upon in the way the console controls them. For example, Muhammad Ali dances about the ring, throwing many quick, straight punches, whereas Rocky Marciano constantly moves forward, throwing heavier punches such as hooks or uppercuts.

Presentation
In terms of presentation, one noticeable area of improvement over the previous game is the animation; for example, whereas previously boxers that were standing still or moving about the ring only had one frame of animation, now they have several more, slightly moving their arms and breathing as if they are alive. The top-down map featured in the first game has been replaced by a small 2.5D view of the ring that works in similar way but is easier to understand. Another improvement is that ring announcements are now made by Michael Buffer. His famous phrase "Let's get ready to rumble!" is present. The game also introduces a replay feature, allowing players to pause and replay a segment of the in-ring action at any time. Finally, there are also much more detailed punch statistics at the end of each round and the fight itself.

Other boxers
The 30 fictional boxers are (at factory default settings):

Byron Flagg only appears in exhibition mode
Jack Stellino only appears in career mode

Reception

Allgame gave the game a score of 4.5 stars out of a possible 5 in their overview. Game Players gave it a score of 56% in their February 1994 issue.

References

External links
Greatest Heavyweights at MobyGames
FAQ at GameFAQs

1993 video games
Boxing video games
Malibu Interactive games
Sega Genesis games
Sega Genesis-only games
Sega video games
Multiplayer and single-player video games
Video games developed in the United States
Video games based on real people
Cultural depictions of boxers
Cultural depictions of American men
Cultural depictions of Muhammad Ali
Cultural depictions of Joe Louis
Cultural depictions of Jack Dempsey